Parliamentary elections were held in Colombia on 16 September 1951 to elect the Senate and Chamber of Representatives. Although the Liberal Party boycotted the elections, some Liberals from the Populares faction did stand. As a result of the boycott, the seats reserved for the minority party were left vacant, whilst the Conservative Party won the remainder.

Results

Senate

Chamber of Representatives

References

Parliamentary elections in Colombia
Colombia
1951 in Colombia
Election and referendum articles with incomplete results
September 1951 events in South America